Sevier is an unincorporated community in southwestern Sevier County, Utah, United States. It lies in the valley of the Sevier River along U.S. Route 89 southwest of the city of Richfield, the county seat of Sevier County.  Its elevation is 5,584 feet (1,702 m).

Description
Although Sevier is unincorporated, it has a post office, with the ZIP code of 84766. It has a population of approximately 80 people. Sevier has many farms.

Sevier has experienced rapid population growth in the 1990s and 2000s, and seasonal migrant laborers, mostly of Mexican and other Hispanic nationalities, made the population transfluid over the course of the year.

Climate
This climatic region is typified by large seasonal temperature differences, with warm to hot (and often humid) summers and cold (sometimes severely cold) winters.  According to the Köppen Climate Classification system, Sevier has a humid continental climate, abbreviated "Dfb" on climate maps.

See also

References

External links

Unincorporated communities in Sevier County, Utah
Unincorporated communities in Utah